Monday Night Mayhem is a 2002 television film about the origin of ABC's television series Monday Night Football.  It debuted on the U.S. cable TV network TNT on January 14, 2002. It was based on the 1988 nonfiction book of the same title by Marc Gunther and Bill Carter.

Cast
 John Turturro as Howard Cosell
 John Heard as Roone Arledge
 Kevin Anderson as Frank Gifford
 Nicholas Turturro as Chet Forte
 Brad Beyer as Don Meredith 
 Patti LuPone as Emmy Cosell
 Eli Wallach as Leonard Goldenson
 Shuler Hensley as Keith Jackson
 Jay Thomas as Pete Rozelle
 Brennan Brown as Bob Goodrich
 Chad L. Coleman as O. J. Simpson

Production
Filming took place in New York, New Jersey, and other locations by Turner Network Television.

Reception
Phil Gallo of Variety complained that "nobody looks quite right" and "there is invariably a thin line between caricature and character."

Larry Stewart of the Los Angeles Times gave the film a negative review, writing, "The book was good, the movie isn’t. It appears to be cheaply made and the characters, particularly Frank Gifford and Don Meredith, are not believable. John Turturro does a decent job portraying Cosell, but his performance isn’t enough to save the movie." Stewart concludes, "It doesn’t come close to matching a documentary HBO did a couple of years ago titled “Cosell.”"

Allen Barra of The New York Times gave the film a more positive review, writing that the film "works because of Mr. Turturro's unabashed joy in playing a part as juicy as Howard Cosell."

Related films
In the same year, Jon Voight portrayed Howard Cosell in the Michael Mann biopic Ali (2001).  Voight's performance earned him an Academy Award nomination.

Home media 
The movie was released on VHS on September 10, 2002.

References

External links

American football films
Films about television
Films based on non-fiction books
TNT Network original films
2002 television films
2002 films
Monday Night Football
ABC Sports
Films set in the 1970s
Films set in the 1980s
Films directed by Ernest Dickerson
Films scored by Van Dyke Parks
Films shot in New York (state)
Films shot in New Jersey
2000s American films